Georges Maurice Edmond Dorléac (26 March 1901 – 5 December 1979) was a French actor of the stage and screen. He was the father of actresses Catherine Deneuve, Françoise Dorléac and Sylvie Dorléac.
He was the husband of actress Renée Simonot, who was the dubbing voice for Olivia de Havilland.

Filmography

External links 
 

1901 births
1979 deaths
French male film actors
French male television actors
French male stage actors
French male voice actors
Male actors from Paris
20th-century French male actors
Dorléac family